Sir Thomas Rivers, 2nd Baronet (died 1657) was an English politician who sat in the House of Commons  in 1656.

Rivers was the son of James Rivers and his wife Charity Shirley, daughter of Sir John Shirley of Isfield Sussex. He succeeded his grandfather Sir John Rivers, 1st Baronet to the baronetcy in around 1651, his father having died earlier.

In 1656, Rivers was elected Member of Parliament for Sussex in the First Protectorate Parliament. 
 
Rivers died unmarried in around 1657.

References

Year of birth missing
1657 deaths
English MPs 1656–1658
Baronets in the Baronetage of England